Radim Bičánek (born January 18, 1975) is a Czech former professional ice hockey defenceman who played in the National Hockey League (NHL). He was drafted in the second round, 27th overall, by the Ottawa Senators in the 1993 NHL Entry Draft.

Playing career

After playing two seasons in the Ontario Hockey League for the Belleville Bulls, Bičánek made his National Hockey League debut with the Senators in the 1994–95 season, appearing in six games.  He went on to  spend the entire 1995–96 season with the Senators' American Hockey League affiliate, the Prince Edward Island Senators.  Bičánek appeared in 21 more NHL games with Ottawa in the 1996–97 season.

After appearing sparingly for the Senators during the 1997–98 and 1998–99 seasons, Bičánek was traded to the Chicago Blackhawks on March 12, 1999, in exchange for a pick in the 1999 NHL Entry Draft.  The Blackhawks left him unprotected for the 2000 NHL Expansion Draft, allowing him to be selected by the Columbus Blue Jackets for their inaugural season.

During the 2004–05 NHL lockout, Bičánek returned to the Czech Republic to play for HC JME Znojemští Orli. After five seasons in Znojmo he moved to  HC Kometa Brno.

Career statistics

Regular season and playoffs

International

References

External links 
 

1975 births
Living people
Belleville Bulls players
Binghamton Senators players
Chicago Blackhawks players
Cleveland Lumberjacks players
Columbus Blue Jackets players
Czech ice hockey defencemen
Czechoslovak ice hockey defencemen
Detroit Vipers players
Grand Rapids Griffins (IHL) players
HC Dukla Jihlava players
HC Karlovy Vary players
HC Kometa Brno players
Manitoba Moose (IHL) players
Orli Znojmo players
Ottawa Senators players
Ottawa Senators draft picks
People from Uherské Hradiště
Prince Edward Island Senators players
Syracuse Crunch players
Worcester IceCats players
Sportspeople from the Zlín Region
Czech expatriate ice hockey players in Canada
Czech expatriate ice hockey players in the United States